Perth was an electoral district of the Legislative Council of Western Australia from 1870 to 1890, during the period when the Legislative Council was the sole chamber of the Parliament of Western Australia.

Perth was one of the original ten Legislative Council districts created by the Legislative Council Act 1870 (33 Vict, No. 13). The district's southern boundary ran along the Swan River, the Canning River, and Bull Creek (although North Fremantle was assigned to the district of Fremantle). It then ran south-east out to near present-day Ashendon, before going north-east to Mount Dale, which was the easternmost point within the district. Perth's northern boundary ran north-west from Mount Dale to Belmont (on the Swan River), then north by west to Lake Gnangara, and finally north to a due east line intersecting Nowergup Lake. The district was bordered by the district of Swan to the north and east, the district of Murray and Williams to the south-east (after 1873), and the district of Fremantle to the south.

Along with Fremantle and the North District (from 1883 only), Perth elected two members to the Legislative Council (unlike the other constituencies, which only elected one member each). In total, eight men represented the district between 1870 and 1890, the longest-serving of which was Sir Luke Leake (from 1870 to 1886). Several of the district's representatives went on to serve in the Legislative Assembly after the advent of responsible government in 1890.

Members

References

Perth
1870 establishments in Australia
1890 disestablishments in Australia
Constituencies established in 1870
Constituencies disestablished in 1890